Stephen Adam (born 10 November 1986) is a former Scottish professional footballer who played as a defender for East Stirling and Livingston.

Club career

Livingston
Adam was a product of the youth academy at Livingston and shared a dressing room with Robert Snodgrass who went on to play for Scotland and West Ham United.  Chances were few and far between for him at Livi, who were enjoying perhaps their most successful spell ever, finishing 3rd in the Scottish Premier League in 2001-02, qualifying for UEFA Europa League and winning the Scottish League Cup in 2003–04.

The defender made his debut for Livi in a 3–1 win against Kilmarnock at Rugby Park on 27 November 2004.

Raith Rovers
He signed for Raith Rovers on loan in 2006 and made his league debut for the club in a 1–0 win against Forfar on 4 February 2006.

East Stirling and Craigielea Star
Adam signed for East Stirling in 2006 and made his debut in a 4-1 Scottish League Cup defeat away to Cowdenbeath on 8 August 2006.

He last played for Craiglea Star in 2007.

References

External links
Stephen Adam on Soccerbase

1986 births
Living people
Scottish footballers
Scottish Football League players
Association football forwards
East Stirlingshire F.C. players
Raith Rovers F.C. players
Livingston F.C. players